The Tales of Rowan Hood are a series of five books by Nancy Springer. The first book, which was published in 2001 by Philomel Books, focuses on a young girl who dresses as a boy and goes to join Robin Hood's men, in part because her father is Robin Hood.

Plot

Rowan Hood: Outlaw Girl of Sherwood Forest (2001)
The book features a girl named Rosemary, the daughter of Robin Hood and a healer. When her mother, Celandine, is burned alive in her home as a witch, Rosemary disguises herself as a boy, adopts the name Rowan, and leaves to find her father. Along the way she meets a dog she names Tykell, and the minstrel Lionel. She is accidentally spotted by Guy of Gisborne, who is enraged when she refuses to give her bow and arrows to him.

Lionclaw: A Tale of Rowan Hood (2001)
Lionel's father wants to kill and places a bounty on Lionel. Bounty hunters learn that Lionel and Rowan are friends, so capture and torture Rowan to draw out Lionel.

Outlaw Princess of Sherwood: A Tale of Rowan Hood (2003) 
Ettarde escapes an arranged marriage and rescues her mother from her abusive husband.

Wild Boy: A Tale of Rowan Hood (2004) 
Tod, the son of the sheriff of Nottingham, is captured by Robin Hood's group, and caught in a man trap.

Rowan Hood Returns: The Final Chapter (2005) 
After learning the identities of the four people who killed Celandine, Rowan sets out with the others on a journey to kill them for revenge.

References

Series of children's books
Robin Hood books
Children's historical novels
American children's novels
2000s children's books
Novels by Nancy Springer
Parallel literature